"Memories" is a ballad-song by Dutch symphonic metal and rock band Within Temptation from their third studio album, The Silent Force. It was released as the second single from the album on 31 January 2005 also accompanying a music video. The song was covered by American classical crossover singer Jackie Evancho for her third studio album, Awakening.

Track listing
CD single
"Memories"
"Aquarius" (orchestral version)

Music Video
The Memories video tells the story of an aged Sharon den Adel who returns to her old house, which is now for sale. As she enters her old home, she is transformed into her younger self and the house is restored to how it is in her memories. In some scenes, den Adel walks around the house, haunted by memories of her old lover and in others, she is in a room with other bandmates singing.  Jeroen, the band's bassist, plays a double bass in one of the scenes from the past, while Martijn, their keyboard player, plays the piano.
As she leaves the house towards the end, she becomes her aged self again, and the house falls back into its current disrepair.

Charts

Weekly charts

Year-end charts

Footnotes

Within Temptation songs
2005 singles
Songs written by Sharon den Adel
Songs written by Robert Westerholt
Songs written by Martijn Spierenburg
Heavy metal ballads
2004 songs
Roadrunner Records singles
2000s ballads